Weiqiao is a town in  Zouping County in northwestern Shandong province, China, located about  northwest of the county seat. , it has 82 villages under its administration.

See also 
 List of township-level divisions of Shandong

References 

Township-level divisions of Shandong
Zouping